The 1953–54 SM-sarja season was the 23rd season of the SM-sarja, the top level of ice hockey in Finland. 10 teams participated in the league, and TBK Tampere won the championship.

Regular season

Group A

Group B

Qualification for final 
 TBK Tampere - HPK Hämeenlinna 6:2

3rd place 
 HPK Hämeenlinna - TPS Turku 6:5/5:5 OT

Final 
 Karhu-Kissat Helsinki - TBK Tampere 0:4/0:4

External links
 Season on hockeyarchives.info

Fin
Liiga seasons
1953–54 in Finnish ice hockey